Calle de Preciados (or simply Preciados), is a public pedestrian street in central Madrid, Spain, which spans from Puerta del Sol to Plaza de Santo Domingo via Plaza de Callao, where it takes a bend. It is about 500-metre long.

History 

Already in 1905, the street was an important retail area, with a predominance of the tailoring and textile sector, shoe and footwear, pharmacy, as well as catering businesses. Throughout the 20th century, commercial activity boosted in the wake of the growth of Galerías Preciados and Corte Inglés department stores (by the purchase of neighbouring businesses). Starting in December 1967, the street started being closed to traffic on a temporary basis for the Christmas season owing to the large flow of pedestrians. On 20 October 1973, the permanent pedestrianisation of the street (together with Calle del Carmen's) was formally inaugurated by Mayor . Galerías Preciados could not cope with El Corte Inglés' growth and ended being acquired by its rival in 1995. As of 2018, Preciados is one of the busiest pedestrian streets in Europe.

References 

Sol neighborhood, Madrid
Streets in Madrid